is a four-piece Japanese rock band which started in 2001. They signed to Toy's Factory in 2005, but changed labels to Tearbridge Records/Avex in 2010.
Their first mini album was released in 2003 and they also played their first live performance the same year.

Band members

Vocalist, guitarist
Birthdate: 8 July 1982
Hometown: Osaka

Guitarist
Birthdate: 13 February 1981
Hometown: Fukui Prefecture

Bassist
Birthdate: 12 November 1977
Hometown: Osaka

Drummer
Birthdate: 19 May 1978
Hometown: Nara Prefecture

Discography

Albums

Indie
Kyō Ano Hashi no Mukou Made (今日あの橋の向こうまで)
Release Date: 26 January 2005 (Re-release)/ 10 December 2003 (Tokiola Records)
 Track List:
Kiitemasu ka Otsukisama? (聞いてますか お月様?)
Hazunamono (はずなもの)
Mikazuki (三日月)
Shinzūriki (神通力)
Silk Hat (シルクハット)
Cider (さいだー)
Kyō Ano Hashi no Mukō made (今日あの橋の向こうまで)

Major
Awai Aka to Kirei na Ao (淡い赤ときれいな青と)
 Release Date: 25 May 2005
 Track List:
Yūkei (夕景)
Ame no bori (雨のぼり)
Ishi kurobu (石コロブ)
Dorekurai no Yoru (どれくらいの夜)
Folk (フォーク)
Pool (プール)
I no Naka no Sekai (井の中の世界)
Utsukushiki Tooboe (美しき遠吠え)
Furitashi no Uta (ふりだしの歌)
 Misora (ミソラ)
Art in the Earth
 Release Date: 28 June 2006
 Track List:
Doll (ドール)
Ukraine (ウクライナ)
Asa to Yoru (朝と夜)
Natsu no Owari, (夏の終わり、)
Capsule (カプセル)
Jōshō Kiryū (上昇気流)
Kotoba (言葉)
Necromancer (ネクロマンサー)
Lightning Style (ライトニングスタイル)
Niji (虹)
Bokura no Uta (僕らの歌)
Sekai de Ichiban Kirai na Koto (世界で一番嫌いなこと)
 Release Date: 21 November 2007
Track List:
Yūki no Hana (勇気の花)
Saigishin (さいぎしん)
Binetsu Shōnen (微熱少年)
Monaka (モナカ)
Rain/That/Something
118
Schneider (シュナイダー)
Me and My Love
Antenna (アンテナ)
Kūchū Buranko (空中ブランコ)
 Sekaiichi (セカイイチ)
 Release Date: 25 February 2009
 Track List:
New Pop Song Order
Aikotoba (合言葉)
Atarimae no Sora (あたりまえの空)
You Gotta Love
Last Waltz
Interlude
Akari (あかり)
Amai Jōnetsu (甘い情熱)
Jaipur Town
Oil Shock
Buriki no Tsuki (ブリキの月)
Present (ぷれぜんと)
Subarashii Sekai (素晴らしい世界)

Singles
Furidashi no Uta (ふりだしの歌)
Release date: 28 April 2004/26 January 2005
 Track list:
Furidashi no Uta (ふりだしの歌)
Kaerimichi (帰り道)
Misora (ミイラ)
Ishi Korobu (石コロブ)
Release date: 6 April 2005
 Track list:
Ishi Korobu (石コロブ)
Tawakoto Nikki (たわごと日記)
Yubikiri (ゆびきり)
Niji (虹)
Release date: 2 November 2005
 Track list:
Niji (虹)
Wasureta Koto (忘れてた事)
In the Art
Release date: 24 May 2006
 Track list:
Capsule (カプセル)
Lightning Style (ライトニングスタイル)
Shirube (しるべ)
Rain/That/Something
Release date: 27 June 2007
 Track list:
Rain/That/Something
Kanashii Kotoba (悲しいことば)
Akari (あかり)
Release date: 22 October 2008
 Track list:
Akari (あかり)
Tegami (手紙)
Kūchū Buranko (空中ブランコ) (Studio acoustic track)
Step On
Release date: 3 November 2010
 Track list:
Step On
Grace Kelly (グレース・ケリー)
Bench (ベンチ)
Sainō to Kaihō (才能と解放)

DVD
 Top Of The Clips
 Release date: 16 September 2009
 The live clip portion of the DVD was recorded at Daikanyama Unit on 17 May 2009 on the "Top Of The Clips Tour".
Track list:
 Clips:
Silk Hat (シルクハット)
Furidashi no Uta (ふりだしの歌)
Ishi Korobu (石コロブ)
Ame no Bori (雨のぼり)
Niji (虹)
Bokura no Uta (僕らの歌)
Capsule (カプセル)
Rain / That / Something
Yūki no Hana (勇気の花)
Atari (あかり)
Buriki no Tsuki (ブリキの月)
Present (ぷれぜんと)
Live:
New Pop Song Order
Jaipur Town
Atarimae no Sora (あたりまえの空)
Last Waltz
Amai Jōnetsu (甘い情熱)
You Gotta Love
Present (ぷれぜんと)
Buriki no Tsuki (ブリキの月)
Aikotoba (合言葉)
Oil Shock
I no Naka no Sekai (井の中の世界)
Rain / That / Something
Atari (あかり)
Subarashii Sekai (素晴らしい世界)
Kiitemasu ka Otsukisama? (聞いてますか お月様？)

Others
Download
Present (ぷれぜんと)
Release date: 14 November 2008
Track list:
Present (ぷれぜんと)

References

External links
 Official website
 Official Blog
 Official Myspace Page
 Sekaiichi i-Radio Program
 Official YouTube Channel

Japanese rock music groups
Musical groups established in 2001
2001 establishments in Japan
Musical groups from Osaka